Marsh Island may refer to:

Marsh Island (Florida)
Marsh Island (Louisiana)
Marsh Island (Maine)
Marsh Island (Washington), in Union Bay, Seattle